Mickaël Barreto (born 18 January 1991) is a French professional footballer who plays as an attacking midfielder for  club AC Ajaccio.

References

External links
 Mickaël Barreto profile at foot-national.com
 
 

1991 births
Living people
Footballers from Paris
French footballers
Association football midfielders
Ligue 1 players
Ligue 2 players
Championnat National players
ES Troyes AC players
ÉFC Fréjus Saint-Raphaël players
AS Cannes players
US Avranches players
US Orléans players
AJ Auxerre players
AC Ajaccio players
French people of Portuguese descent